1st Wing, No. 1  Wing, etc. may refer to:

Commonwealth of Nations
 1 Wing, a unit of the Royal Canadian Air Force at CFB Kingston
 1st Polish Fighter Wing, a former unit of the Royal Air Force during World War II composed primarily of Polish personnel
 No. 1 Wing AAC, a former unit of the British Army Air Corps
 No. 1 Wing RAAF, a unit of the Royal Australian Air Force
 No. 1 Wing RAF, a unit of the Royal Air Force
 No. 1 Wing RCAF, a former unit of the Royal Canadian Air Force
 No. 1 Wing SLAF, a training unit of the Sri Lankan Air Force

United States
 1st Bombardment Wing, a unit of the United States Army Air Forces, designated 1st Wing from 1919 to 1924 and 1935–1940
 1st Fighter Wing, a unit of the United States Air Force
 1st Marine Aircraft Wing, a unit of the United States Marine Corps
 1st Special Operations Wing, a unit of the United States Air Force
 1st Space Wing, a former unit of the United States Air Force
 Carrier Air Wing One, a unit of the United States Navy

Worldwide
 1st Air Force Wing Reserve, a unit of the Philippines Air Force
 1st Air Wing (JASDF), a unit of the Japan Air Self-Defense Force
 1st Wing (Belgium), a unit of the Belgian Air Component
 Flugabwehrraketengeschwader 1, a unit of the German Air Force